= Jingji =

Jingji may refer to:

- Jingji Circuit (Tang dynasty) (京畿道), a Tang dynasty circuit around its capital Chang'an
- Jingji Circuit (Song dynasty) (京畿路), a Song dynasty circuit around its capital Kaifeng Prefecture

== See also ==
- Gyeonggi Province, Korean equivalent
- Kinki
- Kinh Kỳ, Vietnamese equivalent, is a nickname of Hanoi
